Ajman Club (Arabic: نادي عجمان‎) is an Emirati football club based in Ajman. In 2015, Ajman was relegated to the second division, but managed to climb back to the top flight in 2017.

Kit & sponsors 
Traditional color of Ajman Club home kit is orange. Currently the kits are manufactured by Adidas. From 2018 to 2021 the kit manufacturer was Hummel and before that by Uhlsport.

Ajman Bank is a shirt sponsor of Ajman Club.

Honours
The club has gained the following honours:

 Etisalat Emirates Cup: 1
Winners: 2013
Runner-up: 2010
 UAE President Cup: 1
 *Winners: 1983/1984
 UAE Division One: 2
 *Winners: 2010-11, 2016–17
 UAE Vice Presidents Cup 1
 *Winners: 2010–11

Current squad

As of UAE Pro-League:

Unregistered players